Juha Petteri Jokela (born 7 January 1970 in Tampere) is a Finnish playwright and scriptwriter, best known for his Mobile Horror play and TV series.

Jokela graduated from high school gymnasium in Tampere in 1989  and studied the literature of science and theater studies at the University of Helsinki 1990–1994 and was a student of the Theatre Academy from 1994 onwards.

Jokela is married to actress Mari Lehtonen. He has written plays such as Fundamentalisti (2006), performed at the Jurkka Theatre.

Filmography 
As writer
 Nahkiaiset (1998) – TV series
 Ugrilampaat (1999) – TV series
 Pulkkinen (17 episodes, 1999) – TV series
 Don't Push the River (2000) – TV film
 Hupiklubi (2002) – TV series
 Remontti (2003) – TV series
 Me Stallarit (2004) – TV series
 Firma (11 episodes, 2005) – TV series
 Röyhkeä diplomaatti (2 episodes, 2007) – TV series
 Kallio (12 episodes, 2010) – TV series
 Mobile Horror (2010) – TV film
 Virta (8 episodes, 2010) – TV series
 Kimmo (3 episodes, 2012) – TV series

References

External links 
 

1970 births
Living people
Finnish dramatists and playwrights
Finnish screenwriters
University of Helsinki alumni
People from Tampere